Talitsky District is an administrative district (raion), one of the thirty in Sverdlovsk Oblast, Russia. As a municipal division, it is incorporated as Talitsky Urban Okrug. Its administrative center is the town of Talitsa. As of the 2010 Census, the total population of the district was 47,309, with the population of Talitsa accounting for 34.3% of that number.

Boris Yeltsin was born in Butka, in the district.

References

Notes

Sources

Districts of Sverdlovsk Oblast